The  is a second generation home video game console developed by Gakken and released in Japan in 1983 for a price of ¥8,800.

The system was made to compete with the Epoch Cassette Vision, which had a market dominance of 70% in Japan.

The console was released months after the Nintendo Famicom and Sega SG-1000 which, although more expensive at ¥15,000, were more advanced and had more features as well as bigger games libraries; furthermore, Epoch had just launched the Cassette Vision Jr. revision for ¥5,000. These factors made the system obsolete from the start, with a high price tag, very few and comparably rudimentary games, and a strange form factor, leading to poor sales. As a result, it is now a very rare collector's item among some retro gamers.

Technical specifications 

 Internal Graphics: Motorola MC6847
 RAM: 2 Kb
 CPU (cartridge): Motorola MC6801 (8-bit) clocked at 4 MHz
Image: 128 × 192 pixel; 9 colors, 4 of the can be shown at the same time

Games
There were only 6 games officially released for the system, each being sold for ¥3,800;
 Excite Invader
 Mr. Bomb
 Robotan Wars
  - A port of Super Cobra
 Frogger
 
Each of the games is designed for one player only.

References 

Products introduced in 1983
Second-generation video game consoles
Home video game consoles